The 1904–05 Arizona Wildcats men's basketball team represented the University of Arizona during the 1904–05 college men's basketball season. The head coach was Orin A. Kates, coaching his first season with the Wildcats.

Schedule

|-

References

Arizona Wildcats men's basketball seasons
Arizona Wildcats